Eknath Gaikwad (1 January 1940 – 28 April 2021) was an Indian politician from the Indian National Congress (INC) political party. He was a member of the 15th Lok Sabha and the 14th Lok Sabha of India. He died from COVID-19 in 2021.

Personal life
Gaikwad belonged to an Ambedkarite Buddhist family. Gaikwad's daughter is Varsha Gaikwad, who is a four term Member of Maharashtra Legislative Assembly and a ex-Cabinet Minister of Maharashtra.

Career 
He represented the Mumbai South Central constituency of Mumbai. He lost the seat to Rahul Shewale in 2014. He has been three times a Member of Legislative Assembly from Dharavi and also twice state minister of Maharashtra state cabinet. Since 1985, he has represented Dharavi which is Asia's largest slum.

Positions held 
 1985-1990: Member of Maharashtra Legislative Assembly
 1990-1995: Member of Maharashtra Legislative Assembly
 1999-2004: Member of Maharashtra Legislative Assembly
1999-2004: Maharashtra State Minister For Health, Medical Education, Social Justice
 2004-2009: Member of Parliament, Lok Sabha
 2009-2014: Member of Parliament, Lok Sabha
2017-2020: President Of Mumbai Congress Committee

References

|-

|-

1940 births
2021 deaths
Indian Buddhists
20th-century Buddhists
21st-century Buddhists
Indian National Congress politicians
Maharashtra MLAs 1985–1990
Maharashtra MLAs 1990–1995
Maharashtra MLAs 1999–2004
People from Maharashtra
India MPs 2009–2014
India MPs 2004–2009
Marathi politicians
Lok Sabha members from Maharashtra
People from Satara (city)
Politicians from Mumbai
Deaths from the COVID-19 pandemic in India
Indian National Congress politicians from Maharashtra